The 2017 Red Bull Global RallyCross Championship was the seventh and final season of the Global RallyCross Championship. Scott Speed was the reigning Supercars champion for a second season and Cabot Bigham was the reigning GRC Lites champion. The schedule consisted of twelve rounds at eight different venues.

Schedule

Entry list

Supercars

GRC Lites
Every driver competes in an Olsbergs MSE-built GRC Lites car.

Results and standings

Race results

Drivers' championships

Scoring system
Points were awarded based on finishing positions as shown in the chart below:

In addition, points were awarded in all rounds of heats and semifinals. Heat winners earned seven points and semi winners earned ten points.

Supercars

GRC Lites

Manufacturers' championship

References

External links
 

GRC Rallycross
Global RallyCross Championship